Rimski Šančevi is an urban neighborhood of the city of Novi Sad, Serbia. It is mostly an industrial zone, but it is partially a residential area as well.

Name
Its name means "the Roman trenches". It was named like this because of land shapes ("trenches") that exist at this location. Although, these land shapes are of unknown origin, they were named "rimski" (Roman) because of the popular belief that old Romans created them. However, modern researchers agree that Romans were not builders of the trenches - it is most likely that trenches were built in the 3rd and 4th century by old Sarmatians.

Geography
Neighborhood is located in northern part of Novi Sad, near neighborhoods of Klisa and Gornje Livade and Deponija industrial zone.

Features
There is a meteorological station in Rimski Šančevi.

See also
Neighborhoods of Novi Sad
Industrial zones in Novi Sad

References
Enciklopedija Novog Sada, knjiga 23, Novi Sad, 2004.
Program radova na uređivanju građevinskog zemljišta za 2003. godinu, Zavod Za Izgradnju Grada, Novi Sad.

External links 

Weather for Rimski Šančevi
Weather Report for Rimski Šančevi

Novi Sad neighborhoods